Bravehearted is the debut studio album by the American duo the Bravehearts. A group consisting of Nas' brother Jungle and fellow friend Wiz.

Commercial performance
The album, however, did not sell well due to little promotion, it only came in at number 75 in the Billboard 200 Charts and 20 in the Hip Hop/R&B Charts. Besides Nas releasing an album off his Ill Will Records, Bravehearts were the only other label members to release a record off this label.

Singles
The album had one single, "Quick to Back Down". The track was produced by Lil Jon and featured Nas and Lil Jon on the track. The chorus had Nas saying quick phrases in distaste for animosity towards anonymous rappers, followed by Lil Jon yelling "quick to back down!" The song was released in 2003, when the beef with Nas and Jay-Z was still brewing. Nas sent out a subliminal line to Jay-Z with the line "First of all this is Nas I'ma Braveheart veteran/and y'all already know who I'm better than." He also said "Who's the next label I'ma bury?/CEO's, rappers and A&R's go to the rap cemetery," which indirectly implies that of Roc-A-Fella. Overall, Nas as well as Wiz and Jungle rhyme with threatening messages, with "Y'all talk shit but I smell fear, mothafuckas" at the end of the verses.

Subliminals
The album had 2 songs dissing Jay-Z, with “Quick to Back Down” and “Bravehearted” featuring Nas. Nas on “Quick to Back Down” he sent a few subliminal since the beef between him and Jay-Z was still brewing. He said “First of all this is Nas I'ma Braveheart veteran/and y'all already know who I'm better than." He also said "Who's the next label I'ma bury?/CEO's, rappers and A&R's go to the rap cemetery”.

But on “Bravehearted” in which that song also features Nas, Jungle (Nas’ brother) took shots at Jay-Z calling him a “bitch” and even said his name. It is apparently Jungle's response to Jay-Z dissing him, Nas and Jaz-O on Blueprint 2 that previous year. After that album, the beef died down and ended up reconciling in October 2005.

Track listing

Chart positions

References

2003 albums
Bravehearts albums
Albums produced by Swizz Beatz
Albums produced by Lil Jon
Albums produced by L.E.S. (record producer)
Albums produced by Neo da Matrix